Jastrowie  is a town in northwestern Poland of approximately 9,000 inhabitants in Złotów County, Greater Poland Voivodeship. It has 8,900 inhabitants (1998) and lies on the edge of the Gwda river valley. The town is located on the Oska stream.

History

Jastrowie was one of the southernmost centres of the Pomeranians. In the beginning of the 14th century it belonged to the Ujście castellany. On May 5, 1602, the town received the German city rights granted by Piotr Potulicki and confirmed by King Sigismund III Vasa.

Protestantism was introduced in the mayority German speaking town 1587 when the Catholic pastor converted, and in 1600 the old church was demolished and replaced by a new building. However, the Protestants could only keep the former Catholic parish church until 1619, because that year the preacher Martin Goldbach converted to Catholicism, after which the church was returned to the Catholics. 

In the 17th century the town developed quickly. New inhabitants arrived, mostly more Germans from Pomerania, but also settlers from Scotland, and Jews. 

The religious struggle in Jastrow reached its climax in 1768 when soldiers belonging to the Polish nobleman Roskowski killed the lutheran preacher Willich.

After the Partitions of Poland the town was incorporated into Prussia. For the time being, the Lutherans went to the church services in the neighboring Pomeranian villages of Zamborst and Flederborn, but later - after 1773 - got religious freedom and as a result their own church with the support of the Prussian government. 

In the 19th century Jastrow became one of the most important centres of horse trade. During World War II, Jastrow was an important point of Pommernstellung (Wał Pomorski), one of the most important lines of fortification in the East of Germany. The town was eventually captured by the Red Army on 2 February 1945, the German population fled or was expelled after the annexation and expropriation by Poland and replaced with Polish settlers. The town was renamed Jastrowie.

Currently Jastrowie is the site of several wood and bicycle factories. It was part of the Piła Voivodeship from 1975 until 1998, when the administrative region was superseded by the Greater Poland Voivodeship. Jastrowie's most important cultural event is its International Folk Festival "Bukowińskie Spotkania".

Sites of interest

 Town Market (18th century)
 City House (16th century)
 St. Mary's Queen of Poland Church (1882), til 1945 the Lutheran church
 Michael's Archangel Church (1913).

Cities and towns in Greater Poland Voivodeship
Złotów County